Dereçiftlik can refer to:

 Dereçiftlik, Altıeylül
 Dereçiftlik, Honaz